Ștefan Niculescu (July 31, 1927 – January 22, 2008) was a Romanian composer.

Niculescu was born in Moreni, Dâmbovita. He was credited with introducing his own brand of heterophony, a technique based on superimposing melodic material onto variations of itself in order to create textures that are propelled by thematic energy as well as by the more common textural factors of density and levels of activity. This creative approach bears similarities with György Ligeti's micropolyphony, but important aesthetic and stylistic differences set them apart.

Niculescu's work as a teacher made him a mentor to a whole generation of younger Romanian composers, among them Costin Miereanu, Horațiu Rădulescu and Dan Dediu. 

In the 1970s he contributed to the popularization of modern music by organizing public listenings in Bucharest together with Şerban Stănciulescu.

Niculescu's work Ison II for wind and percussion permutates simultaneous segments of a diatonic melody producing a reverberating complexity of sound which is held together by a strong sense of modal clarity. Opus Dacicum for orchestra applies similar textural explorations but with a stronger sense of harmonic movement, often with a Wagnerian lushness that lends this music a sensuous appeal a world apart from Ligeti's cluster-oriented sonorities.

Among his honors are many awards from the Romanian Academy and The Society of Romanian Composers. He also received awards from the Académie des Beaux-Arts in Paris (1972), the International Record Critics Award (1985), and the Herder Prize in Vienna (1994).

References
Niculescu, esteemed Romanian composer
Obituary 

Romanian composers
People from Moreni
1927 births
2008 deaths
Herder Prize recipients